Kevin Krueger (born 1955 or 1956) is a former BC Liberal Member of the Legislative Assembly, in the province of British Columbia, Canada. He represented the riding of Kamloops-North Thompson from 1996 to 2009, and Kamloops-South Thompson from 2009 to 2013. Prior to entering provincial politics, he was a candidate for the federal Liberals in the 1993 federal election.

Before entering politics, Krueger worked for the Insurance Corporation of British Columbia for twenty years.

He was a member of the Executive Council of British Columbia as Minister of Social Development, as Minister of Tourism, Culture and the Arts, as Minister of Community Development and as Minister of State for Mining.

Electoral history

References 

British Columbia Liberal Party MLAs
Year of birth missing (living people)
People from Kamloops
Living people
Members of the Executive Council of British Columbia
21st-century Canadian politicians